Leo Radom  (born 13 December 1944) is a computational chemist and Emeritus Professor of Chemistry at the University of Sydney. He attended North Sydney Boys High School. He has a PhD and a DSc from the University of Sydney and carried out postdoctoral research under the late Sir John Pople. Previously, he was Professor at the Research School of Chemistry at the Australian National University in Canberra, Australia. He has published over 460 papers.

He is a member of the International Academy of Quantum Molecular Science (1989). Until 2011, he was President of the World Association of Theoretical and Computational Chemists (WATOC) and organised the WATOC 2008 Conference in Sydney, Australia.

Awards and honours
In 2001, Radom was awarded the Centenary Medal "for service to Australian society and science in computational quantum chemistry".  In 2019, Radom was appointed a Companion of the Order of Australia "for eminent service to science, particularly to computational chemistry, as an academic, author and mentor, and to international scientific bodies".

References

1944 births
Australian chemists
Living people
Fellows of the Australian Academy of Science
Members of the International Academy of Quantum Molecular Science
People educated at North Sydney Boys High School
Companions of the Order of Australia
Recipients of the Centenary Medal
Schrödinger Medal recipients
Computational chemists
Presidents of the World Association of Theoretical and Computational Chemists